Poladryas is a monotypic genus of butterflies from United States and Central America in the family Nymphalidae. The single species it contains is Poladryas minuta, the dotted checkerspot.

Subspecies
P. m. arachne (W.H. Edwards, 1869) – Arachne checkerspot (Colorado) 
P. m. gilensis (Holland, 1930) (Arizona)
P. m. minuta (Texas)
P. m. monache (Comstock, 1918)
P. m. nympha (W.H. Edwards, 1884) (Arizona, New Mexico)

References

Melitaeini
Monotypic butterfly genera